Noralvis de las Heras is a Paralympian athlete from Cuba competing mainly in category F42-46 throwing events.

Noralvis competed in the 2004 Summer Paralympics in Athens winning a bronze medal in the F42-46 shot put and finishing outside the medals in the discus and javelin.

External links
 las Heras&fname=Noralvis&gender=all profile on paralympic.org

Paralympic athletes of Cuba
Athletes (track and field) at the 2004 Summer Paralympics
Paralympic bronze medalists for Cuba
Living people
Medalists at the 2004 Summer Paralympics
Year of birth missing (living people)
Paralympic medalists in athletics (track and field)
Cuban female discus throwers
Cuban female javelin throwers
Cuban female shot putters
21st-century Cuban women